Lauren L. Williams (born 27 September 1994) is an American-born Saint Kitts and Nevis footballer who plays as a midfielder for the Saint Kitts and Nevis women's national team.

International career
Williams played for Saint Kitts and Nevis at senior level in the 2018 CONCACAF Women's Championship qualification and the 2020 CONCACAF Women's Olympic Qualifying Championship qualification.

Personal life
Williams' younger sister Allison is also a member of the Saint Kitts and Nevis women's national football team. Lauren is currently engaged to her fiancé, Walter Zachery Nall.

References

External links

1994 births
Living people
Citizens of Saint Kitts and Nevis through descent
Saint Kitts and Nevis women's footballers
Women's association football midfielders
Saint Kitts and Nevis women's international footballers
People from Lansdale, Pennsylvania
Soccer players from Philadelphia
American women's soccer players
African-American women's soccer players
American people of Saint Kitts and Nevis descent
Sportspeople of Saint Kitts and Nevis descent
Sportspeople from New Orleans
21st-century African-American sportspeople
21st-century African-American women